Nostromo Chasma  is the unofficial name for a rift valley on Pluto's moon Charon. It was named after the fictional spacecraft in the science-fiction/horror film Alien, which in turn was named after the novel by Joseph Conrad.

External links 

 https://web.archive.org/web/20160309101018/http://pluto.jhuapl.edu/Multimedia/Science-Photos/pdfs/Charon-Map-Annotated.pdf

References

Extraterrestrial valleys
Rifts and grabens
Surface features of Charon